is a character in Resident Evil (Biohazard in Japan), a survival horror video game series created by Japanese company Capcom. She was first introduced as a supporting character in Resident Evil 2 (1998), and became a playable character in Resident Evil 4 (2005). She is a mysterious and ambiguous antiheroine, working for the series' villains but also constantly bailing out Leon S. Kennedy from dire situations. 

Ada also appears in several Resident Evil games and novelizations. In later games, such as Resident Evil 4, The Umbrella Chronicles (2007) and The Darkside Chronicles (2009), her features were based on English actress, Sally Cahill. In the live-action films, Ada has been portrayed by actress Li Bingbing and Lily Gao. 

Ada has been well received from video game publications. Since her debut, she has become popular among the video game community, with high rankings among character popularity polls and considered a sex symbol. Some critics have also praised her well known red dress.

Concept and design

When Resident Evil 2 was still in development, Ada was a white-coat-clad researcher named Linda who aided the player throughout the game. Ada's movie model could not be finished in time. Thus she is the only main character not to appear in a pre-rendered cutscene. The character was changed for the game's final version. Story writer Noboru Sugimura was responsible for adding Ada's work in the scenario while the name Ada was conceived by Kazunori Kadoi. Speaking about the relationship between Leon and Ada, Hideki Kamiya stated in a 1998 interview following the release of Biohazard 2 that his favorite character is Ada Wong because she is "older, tougher, and has a husky voice," appealing to his preference for older women. He drew a picture of her kissing Leon. Urb said: "It's kind of like Mulder and Scully and an X-Files type of deal, where you're waiting for it to happen, but it never does. Maybe in the next one, I'm hoping." When Resident Evil 4 was ported to the PlayStation 2 after Capcom stated that it did not fall under the exclusivity deal with Nintendo, "Separate Ways", a new scenario for Ada Wong was added and written by Haruo Murata. Resident Evil 5 producer Jun Takeuchi later chose Ada and Leon's kiss scene in RE2 as his favourite element of the series. In retrospective, Kamiya feels that Ada is a manipulative character, especially if interacting with Leon. Resident Evil 6 executive producer Hiroyuki Kobayashi said that "We believed her story would be more enjoyable after having gone through the other three scenarios." He further said that "one of the themes of Ada's story is a lone spy working in secret." They originally planned to have a clone for Ada, but instead, Carla Radames was injected with the C-virus, which eventually turned to look like her. In order to confuse gamers, Carla was designed to look identical to Ada with the exception of clothing that does not fit Ada. Ada's original costume from Resident Evil 2 was, however, abandoned for the remake in favor of a beige trenchcoat and large sunglasses worn even at night and indoors. The remake's director Kadoi said about Ada's former wardrobe: "I think wandering around in that dress just getting on with your job as a spy probably doesn't look as realistic and believable as we want in this new game."

To contrast Claire's role from Resident Evil: Degeneration, Ada Wong was picked as the returning heroine in Resident Evil: Damnation. Kamiya initially wanted to follow the dysfunctional romance between Leon and Ada, but such idea was scrapped. Writer Shotaro Suga elaborated that the romance was briefly explored in Resident Evil 4 and since both never met in Resident Evil 5, "there might have been a time when the two met". In Resident Evil: Welcome to Raccoon City, British film director Johannes Roberts originally planned for Ada to appear earlier in the movie but didn't feel like it was a good idea, so he decided for her to appear at the end of credit scene. 

Ada was originally intended to appear in Resident Evil Village as a "mysterious masked person" who saves Ethan Winters from the trial, but was cut from the game due to "conflicting scenarios".

Portrayal
Ada is voiced by English actress Sally Cahill in Resident Evil 2, Resident Evil 4 and Resident Evil: The Darkside Chronicles. Cahill described the character as "a totally hip, modern, kick-ass femme fatale who could handle weapons awesomely" and stated that she loved Ada's "resilience, her strength with still being sexy and very female". In Resident Evil: The Umbrella Chronicles, she was voiced by Megan Hollingshead. In Resident Evil 6, and films such as Resident Evil: Operation Raccoon City and Resident Evil: Damnation, she was voiced by Courtenay Taylor. Courtenay Taylor said that she felt pressure when voicing her character since it was her major debut as Operation Raccoon City was not popular within the media unlike Damnation and Resident Evil 6 and had more knowledge instead about the live-action films. However, Taylor was comforted by the staff and Matthew Mercer in regards to playing her role properly. A motion capture actress in Resident Evil 6, Michelle Lee, said that the process was "definitely a challenge and with the amazing team they were very specific on how she moved, her specific characteristics and even how she stood still." In the reboot film Resident Evil: Welcome to Raccoon City (2021) and the remake of Resident Evil 4 (2023), Wong is played by Lily Gao. She didn't appear until mid-credit-scene. Johannes Roberts said "I brought Ada in earlier into the movie, and I just didn't feel that it was working because it just felt like we were trying to put in one too many main characters within this world." In the remake of Resident Evil 2, she was voiced by Jolene Andersen.

In Resident Evil live-action film series, Li Bingbing was cast as the version of Ada from Resident Evil: Retribution. She did not know anything about the games and the characters, but after learning about them, she thought that Ada's personality was "very much" like her own. In 2012, Li said that the character has "a big fan base" in China. Producer Jeremy Bolt said fans were "very, very pleased with all of our choices [in the film], particularly Li Bingbing, who plays Ada Wong. They visited us on set last week, and they were really blown away by her." The film's producer Robert Kulzer also described her as "perfectly cast", saying: "In addition to being an extremely talented actor, she's sharp, sexy and smart—all qualities that the Ada Wong character had to have." During filming, Li wore a US$7,500 wig and "enjoyed" the firearms training she received. She complained about being cold in Ada's revealing "qipao with a high slit that flapped when the wind blew", but added, "I wanted the slit to be that high after I saw the images of Ada Wong from the game... Not that I wanted it to be that high but that was where the opening would be the most beautiful and cool." Apparently, due to the Senkaku Islands dispute, Li did not attend the Tokyo premiere of the film and reportedly also requested that her image be edited out of its promotional posters in Japan.

Appearances

In Resident Evil series
An American woman of Chinese descent, Ada is first mentioned in the original Resident Evil (1996) set in 1998. A letter written by dying Umbrella Corporation researcher John was addressed to a woman named Ada. The character was eventually given the full name Ada Wong in order to provide a connection to the first game. There was an Umbrella researcher named Linda during the early development stages of the sequel (a version popularly known as Resident Evil 1.5). She makes her first on-screen appearance in Resident Evil 2 (1998), set two months after the events of the first game. In the game, she is a spy for an unnamed rival company who is sent to recover a sample of the deadly G-virus from Umbrella's lab in the zombie-infested Raccoon City. Her secret agenda is exposed, and seriously wounded by either Annette Birkin or the monster Tyrant T-103 in an attempt to save Leon. She later drops him a rocket launcher to defeat the T-103.

Her next starring role is in Resident Evil 4 (2005) set in 2004. She assists Leon in his mission to rescue the U.S. president's daughter Ashley Graham from the sinister cult Los Iluminados that is based in a remote area of Spain. However, her true objective is to obtain a sample of the dominant species Plaga parasite developed by the cult. She reports to the villain Albert Wesker who is now in a high position within the rival company. Ada is dispatched for this mission alongside Jack Krauser who distrusts her and believes she is a threat to Wesker. She enlists the help of the researcher Luis Sera who manages to steal a sample but is then killed by the cult's leader Osmund Saddler. Ada is briefly captured and planned to be sacrificed but manages to escape. After meeting Leon, she saves him from Krauser who was ordered by Wesker to eliminate Leon. Ada destroys the cult's battleship and the Plagas-mutated Krauser and aids Leon in various ways. Eventually, she is taken hostage by Saddler, who uses her as bait to trap Leon. Leon, however, is able to free her, and Ada provides him with a special rocket launcher to destroy a mutated Saddler before escaping with a sample via helicopter. Ada appears in the game's sub-scenario "Assignment: Ada", as well as in the "Mercenaries" mode. In the PlayStation 2, PC, Xbox 360, PlayStation 3 and Wii ports of Resident Evil 4, a new scenario starring Ada was included. Titled "Separate Ways", it depicts the events of the main game from her perspective. The fictional documentary "Ada's Report" describes her involvement with other characters in the story.

In Resident Evil 6 (2012) set in 2012–2013, where she is "a lone spy working in secret". Her campaign, designed to bring the answer to some of the game's mysteries, becomes available after the player finishes the storylines for the main characters Leon S. Kennedy, Chris Redfield, and Jake Muller. During the course of the game, it is revealed that Ada is a former associate of the rogue National Security Advisor Derek C. Simmons, who becomes dangerously obsessed with her. Though she originally worked on her own agenda, she gets caught up in the game's events and is forced to help Leon in his mission to stop Simmons' plans. Ada is a playable character in Resident Evil Re:Verse (2022). She also appears in the remake of Resident Evil 2 (2019) and Resident Evil 4 (2023).

An epilogue in Resident Evil 3: Nemesis as well as a fictional documentary in Code: Veronica confirm that Ada survived the ordeal. Her role in Resident Evil 2 is explored in more detail in Resident Evil: The Umbrella Chronicles (2007) and Resident Evil: The Darkside Chronicles (2009). She appears as an enemy in another Resident Evil 2 spin-off game, the non-canonical Resident Evil: Operation Raccoon City (2012), in which she is also a playable character in its multiplayer "Heroes" mode.

In films

In the live-action film Resident Evil: Retribution (2012), Ada Wong is held captive by the Umbrella-controlled Jill Valentine and fights against Jill and Bad Rain, together with Alice. The game series' Ada appears in the second computer-animated Resident Evil film, Resident Evil: Damnation (2012), set in an Eastern European war zone. Trailers for it showed Ada introducing herself as a special investigator from the UN counter-bioterrorism agency B.S.A.A. She also appeared in the reboot film, Resident Evil: Welcome to Raccoon City (2021), as a mysterious spy, during a mid-credits scene.

Other appearances
Ada was featured in the 1998–1999 manhua Shēnghuà Wēijī 2 ("Biohazard 2"). A romantic comedy retelling the story of Resident Evil 2 centering on Leon, Claire and Ada was released in the Taiwanese two-issue comic Èlíng Gǔbǎo II by Ching Win Publishing in 1999. Capcom screenwriters created two Resident Evil 2 radio dramas broadcast on Radio Osaka in early 1999 and later released by publisher Suleputer as two separate CDs with the common title Biohazard 2 Drama Album, including Ikiteita Onna Spy Ada (lit. "Ada, the Female Spy, is Alive"). Set a few days after the events of the game, it deals with Ada's mission to retrieve Sherry Birkin's pendant with the G-virus sample from Umbrella enforcer HUNK. Ada intercepts the delivery of the locket in the village of Loire in France, eliminating HUNK and his men. She survives an accidental T-virus leak, escapes and realizes her feelings for Leon, deciding to quit the spy business and return to him. Canonically, the characters' story arcs are continued differently, as Ada keeps the pendant with the G-virus and resumes her activities as a spy. Merchandise featuring Ada includes action figures, statues, and figurines.

Outside the Resident Evil franchise, Ada made her first guest appearance in the browser-based social game Onimusha Soul (2013), where she was re-designed to fit a feudal Japan theme. Ada also appears as a non-playable character in the tactical role-playing game Project X Zone 2. In Street Fighter V, Kolin can be dressed in Ada's costume from Resident Evil 6. On March 1, 2021, Ada was added as a playable character in Teppen; before this, she was already featured in multiple cards within the game. Ada also appeared in an online multiplayer battle royale game Knives Out as a costume at July 29 to August 12, 2021. In 2022, She appears as a playable character in asymmetrical survival horror game, Dead by Daylight.

Reception

The character was well received. 
Famitsu included her among the best Japanese video game characters of the 1990s. In 2007, Ada was listed among the 50 greatest female characters in video game history by Rob Wright of Tom's Games, who suggested she be played by Kelly Hu in the live-action Resident Evil series. GameDaily featured her as their "Babe of the Week" in 2007 and described her as a "gun-toting hottie" able to star in her own video game. Complex ranked Ada 19th on the 2011 list of "most diabolical video game she-villains", noting her "dragon-lady qualities." In 2013, Liz Lanier of Game Informer included Ada among the top ten female villains in video games, stating that "whether you want to call her a bad guy or just an anti-hero, it's clear that her enemy is whoever gets in her way; if that happens to be a former ally, so be it." Ryan Bates of GameRevolution ranked her as the 16th on his 2014 list of top "mean girls in gaming" and wrote that "the scariest part about this Resident Evil stalwart is that players never know if she's working for the Umbrella Corporation, for Wesker, for someone else altogether, or for her own motives. Ada proves that a person, man or woman, without loyalties is a person to be distrusted." In 2016, The Guardian included Ada among the "30 truly interesting female game characters" list, claiming that she's "Extremely intelligent and often numerous steps ahead of everyone else, she is never short of a sarcastic comment at the expense of slower characters." In 2017, Inverses Jessica Famularo ranked her as the third-best character in the series: "Her complicated story is one of the most compelling in the series, and her moral ambiguity keeps us guessing. She enters battle with an unparalleled grace, too, and kicks some butt while she's at it." Stacey Henley of TheGamer thought Ada deserved to be in the spotlight for the remake of Resident Evil 4, saying that she's the coolest character that has ever been created and feels her obscurity.

Lara Crigger of The Escapist found Ada to be not only "the femme fatale archetype given pixilated form" but also "a strong, feminist role model" that is "beautiful and sexual" in light of the existentialist philosophies of Simone de Beauvoir. According to Nadine Farghaly of the University of Salzburg, unlike the typically "sexless object" characters such as the Resident Evil series' own Claire Redfield and Rebecca Chambers, or Silent Hills Heather, Ada is a positively gender fluid character as "she has attributes typically associated with males, such as physical strength and intelligence, and traits typically associated with females, such as beauty and poise."

Mass media outlets from around the world have described Ada one of the sexiest Asian and general female characters in all of video gaming. In 2008, UGO ranked Ada as the fourth-top "videogame hottie", describing her as "drop dead gorgeous" and stating that they anticipate what the series has in store for her in the future. In 2011, Complex ranked her as 24th-best-looking sideline chick in games, commenting on Ada's resemblance to Nikita from La Femme Nikita. In 2012, Complexs Larry Hester ranked her as the eighth-best Asian character in video games, stating that this "bad girl killed zombies like roaches with the sophistication of a ballet dancing gunslinger," while Larry Hester from the same magazine put her at the 28th "hottest" women in video games, describing her as "enshrined in fanboy canon forever more." Ranking her as the 14th-sexiest woman in digital entertainment in 2012, IGN Spain noted how she had been "a legend" among gamers for many years.

Together with Leon, Ada was included by Alexander Villafania in The Inquirers 2007 list of the most memorable video game love teams. In 2011, "a highly disfunctional [sic] relationship" between Ada and Leon was ranked as the ninth-top video game romance by James Hawkins of Joystick Division. According to The Mirror in 2016, "since the pair's first encounter in Resident Evil 2, the romantic frisson between the two has been palpable."

Some film critics thought Ada's high-slit dress was practical. Chris Warrington of PlayStation Official Magazine included Ada in her characteristic red dress on the 2012 list of eight best-dressed PlayStation characters, calling her "the wearer of the finest dress on the PlayStation." In 2014, Daniel Żelazny from Polish magazine PSX Extreme ranked it as the seventh-best female outfit in games, while Julia Cook of Paste chose Ada as "best-dressed lady" in gaming and called her "arguably the sexiest character in video games."

Ada also received negative reviews from reviewers. Matt Cundy of GamesRadar+ found Ada's costume from Resident Evil 4 to be unsuitable for the game's theme, ranking her "out-of-our-price-bracket Shanghai hooker" look as the most impractical of all main outfits of the series' stars and commenting that anyone dressing like her to fight zombies "would have to be certifiably mental." In Tropes vs. Women in Video Games, feminist media critic Anita Sarkeesian criticized her outfit (as too revealing) and her wearing high heels during the combat at Resident Evil 4. Play editor Gavin Mackenzie criticized her perceived "bitch" personality in Resident Evil 4 in retrospective from the events of Resident Evil 2. Chinese audiences also criticized Ada, including character actress Li from Resident Evil: Retribution. Xiao Mei of People's Daily has claimed that the "role didn't give Li any chance to 'act'; all she's doing is being pretty on screen, just filling in space." On the other hand, the character's role and dynamic with Leon in Damnation earned more positive responses.

Analysis 
Stephanie Jennings theorizes about the feminizing gaze in video games in the book Feminism in Play. She engages with both the history of the masculine gaze in film theory and game studies, rooting her critique in a close investigation of Ada Wong as both a character and an avatar." She is an enigmatic heroine, according to Bernard Perron of Horror Video Games: Essays on the Fusion of Fear and Play, whose first appearance is conveyed through cinematic close shots of her body dressed in a slit stress. He goes on to say that the camera avoids displaying her face in order to protect her identity, but instead focuses on various body parts in a traditional male gaze montage, while Andrei Nae of Immersion, Narrative, and Gender Crisis in Survival Horror Video Games said that she is a match for the submissive woman-fatale character couple. She went on to say that she is a femme fatale whose patriarchal disobedience demands regulation.

See also

List of Resident Evil characters

References

Action film characters
Capcom protagonists
Clone characters in video games
Female characters in video games
Fictional archers
Fictional assassins in video games
Fictional American people in video games
Fictional Chinese American people
Fictional criminals in video games
Fictional gunfighters in video games
Fictional Federal Bureau of Investigation personnel
Fictional female assassins
Fictional female martial artists
Fictional martial artists in video games
Fictional police officers in video games
Fictional secret agents and spies in video games
Fictional taekwondo practitioners
Fictional wushu practitioners
Fictional zombie hunters
Female horror film characters
Resident Evil characters
Science fiction film characters
Video game bosses
Video game mascots
Video game characters introduced in 1998
Woman soldier and warrior characters in video games